Nathan Papa Kwabana Twum Koranteng (born 26 May 1992) is an English footballer who plays as a winger.

Career
Born in London, Koranteng signed for Conference National team Tamworth on loan in September 2009. He joined Boston United on loan in January 2010.

In August 2010 he joined Rushden & Diamonds on loan for a month.

On 7 January 2012, he scored his first goal for Tonbridge Angels in just his second start.

In April 2013 Koranteng joined Southern Premier side St Neots Town.

Koranteng joined East Thurrock for the start of the 2013–14 season.

In 2013 Koranteng joined Aveley. His debut against Cheshunt was marred by receiving a red card in the first half.
 He left the club after making 25 appearances.

References

External links
Nathan Koranteng profile at the Peterborough United website

1992 births
Living people
English footballers
Association football wingers
Peterborough United F.C. players
Tamworth F.C. players
Spalding United F.C. players
Boston United F.C. players
Rushden & Diamonds F.C. players
Woking F.C. players
Boreham Wood F.C. players
Tonbridge Angels F.C. players
St Neots Town F.C. players
East Thurrock United F.C. players
Aveley F.C. players
English Football League players
National League (English football) players
Footballers from the London Borough of Hackney